Abatxolo is a station on line 2 of the Bilbao metro. It is located in the neighborhood of Azeta, in the municipality of Portugalete. It opened on 20 January 2007.

Station layout 
Abatxolo station follows the typical cavern-shaped layout of most underground Metro Bilbao stations designed by Norman Foster, with the main hall located directly above the rail tracks.

Access 
  9 Los Palangreros St. (Los Palangreros exit)
   2 Azeta St. (Azeta exit, closed during night time services)
   36 Abatxolo St.

Services 
The station is served by line 2 from Basauri to Kabiezes.

References

External links
 

Line 2 (Bilbao metro) stations
Railway stations in Spain opened in 2007
2007 establishments in the Basque Country (autonomous community)